Adeline Sylvia Eugenia Ama Yeboakua Akufo-Addo (née Nana Yeboakua Ofori-Atta; 17 December 1917 – 21 March 2004) was a First Lady in the second republic of Ghana as the wife of Edward Akufo-Addo and mother of Ghanaian president Nana Akufo-Addo.

She died at Korle-Bu Teaching Hospital in Accra on 21 March 2004, aged 86.

Personal life 
Born to Nana Sir Ofori Atta I, Omanhene of Akyem Abuakwa, and Agnes Akosua Dodua of Abomosu, she was the Abontendomhene (the queen mother of the royal house of Ofori Panin Fie of Kyebi). As such, she was officially styled as Nana Yeboakua Ofori-Atta.

Her elder sister was Susan Ofori-Atta, the first female doctor from the Gold Coast. Adeline Akufo-Addo's older brother was William Ofori-Atta, the Gold Coast politician and lawyer, former foreign minister and one of the founding leaders of the United Gold Coast Convention (UGCC) as well as a member of "The Big Six", the group of political activists detained by the British colonial government after the 1948 Accra riots, kicking off the struggle for the attainment of Ghana's independence in 1957. Her other brother was Kofi Asante Ofori-Atta, a Minister for Local Government in the Convention People's Party (CPP) government of Kwame Nkrumah and later Speaker of the Parliament of Ghana.

References 

1917 births
2004 deaths
First ladies of Ghana
Akan people
Alumni of Achimota School
Ghanaian Presbyterians
Ghanaian Protestants
Ofori-Atta family